Carlos Roberto Reyes Berríos (born 21 August 1973, in Santiago, Chile) is a former Chilean footballer who played for clubs in Chile and Mexico.

Career
Reyes began playing club football with Deportes Magallanes. In 1996, he turned professional with Audax Italiano, where he would play eight seasons as a striker.

Reyes moved to Mexico where he played for Real Zacatecas and Nacional de Tijuana.

Teams
  Audax Italiano 1994–1999
  Colo-Colo 2000–2001
  Real Zacatecas 2002–2003
  Audax Italiano 2004–2005
  Magallanes 2006

References

External links
 
 
 Profile at Playerhistory

1973 births
Living people
Chilean footballers
Chilean expatriate footballers
Chile international footballers
Audax Italiano footballers
Colo-Colo footballers
Real Sociedad de Zacatecas footballers
Magallanes footballers
Primera B de Chile players
Chilean Primera División players
Expatriate footballers in Mexico
Chilean expatriate sportspeople in Mexico
Association football forwards
Footballers from Santiago